Albin Alois Ouschan (born August 14, 1990, in Klagenfurt, Austria) is an Austrian pool and billiards player. Ouschan was the 2016 WPA World Nine-ball Championship winner, as well as the runner-up in 2014. He also won the 14.1 Continuous European championship the same year. Ouschan is a multiple time Austrian champion in 8-ball, ten-ball and straight pool. Ouschan alongside partner Mario He won both the 2017 World Cup of Pool, 2019 World Cup of Pool and reached the final of the 2018 World Cup of Pool. They would lose 10–3 to the Chinese team of Wu Jia-qing & Liu Haitao. He won the WPA World Nine-ball Championship for the second time in 2021, beating Omar Al-Shaheen 13–9 in the final. He won the International Open in 2021, defeating Dennis Orcollo 13-6 in the final.

Titles and Achievements
 World Championships
 WPA World Nine-ball Championship (2016, 2021)
 European Open 9-ball Championship (2022)
 International Open 9-Ball Championship (2021)
 China Open 9-Ball Championship (2015)
 World Cup of Pool (2017, 2019) - with (Mario He)
 Mosconi Cup (2015, 2016, 2020, 2021, 2022)
 Most Valuable Player (MVP) (2016)
 Matchroom League Pool 
 Premier League Pool (2022)
 Championship League Pool (2021)
 Euro Tour
 Dutch Open (2015)
 Bosnia Open (2012)
 European Pool Championship 
 Straight Pool (2016)
 Austrian Pool Championship
 Nine-Ball (2004, 2006, 2007, 2008, 2009)
 Straight Pool (2005, 2006, 2010, 2011)
 Eight-Ball (2005, 2006)
 Kings Cup 10-Ball Team East vs. West (2015)
 Accolades & Awards
 AZBilliards Player of the Year (2021)
 EPBF Player of the Year (2016)

References

External links
 Albin Ouschan at AZBilliards.com

1990 births
Living people
Austrian pool players
Austrian sportspeople
Sportspeople from Klagenfurt
WPA World Nine-ball Champions
World champions in pool